Micropterix huemeri is a species of moth belonging to the family Micropterigidae. It was described by Kurz, Kurz & Zeller in 2004. It is probably endemic of the geologically isolated region of the Marguareis in France.

Adults have been found in high alpine grassland (at elevations higher than 2,000 m) in tall herbaceous vegetation around boulders in July.

The forewing length is 3.9 mm for males and 4.4 mm for females.

References

Micropterigidae
Moths described in 2004
Moths of Europe